Makkale Manege Manikya is a 1969 Indian Kannada-language film, directed by A. V. Sheshagiri Rao and produced by N. B. Vathsalan. The film stars Udaykumar, R. Nagendra Rao, Dinesh and Ranga in the lead roles. The film has musical score by Vijaya Bhaskar.

Cast

Udaykumar
R. Nagendra Rao
Dinesh
Ranga
Sathya
Adavani Lakshmi
B. V. Radha
Shailashree
B. Jaya
M. Shivaji Rao
Narayana Rao
Venkata Raman
Govinda Rajan
Kumar
Shivanna
Prakash
Srinivas
Y. R. Ashwath Narayan
Master Krishnakumar
Baby Prashanth

Soundtrack

Reception

References

External links
 

1969 films
1960s Kannada-language films
Films scored by Vijaya Bhaskar
Films directed by A. V. Seshagiri Rao